Lasius is a genus of formicine ants. The type species for this genus is the black garden ant, Lasius niger. Other major members, which live in drier heathland, are the cornfield ant, L. neoniger, and L. alienus. Other species include the temporary social parasites of the L. mixtus group and the hyper-social parasite Lasius fuliginosus. Lasius flavus is also a commonly seen species, building grassy hillocks in undisturbed pasture. In the Alps, these mounds - always aligned east to catch the first rays of the rising sun - have been traditionally used by goatherds as natural compasses. Species in the subgenus Acanthomyops, in particular L. interjectus and L. claviger, are commonly known as citronella ants due to their citronella-like smell.

Moisture ants
Many Lasius species, known collectively as "moisture ants" in the United States, make their nests in and around moist rotting wood as well as under rocks. They can infest buildings, particularly foundation forms in contact with soil, becoming a minor nuisance. They are not considered a structural threat because they only make their galleries in wood that is already decayed. Some species build "cartonlike" nests in moist locations made of decayed wood fragments cemented together with honeydew and the ant's mandibular gland secretions. Workers are monomorphic, 2 to 3 mm long, yellow to dark brown. They are secretive, and forage mostly at night for honeydew and other sweet substances, and may also prey on small insects. Winged reproductive males and females swarm in late summer and fall, which is when building infestations may be noticed. They are distinguished from carpenter ants (Camponotus), another structure-infesting species, by being much smaller, and having a notch in the dorsal thorax (top of the center body division), where carpenter ants have a rounded thorax. Widespread moisture ant species include L. alienus and L. neoniger, as well as some Acanthomyops species.

Species

Lasius alienoflavus Bingham, 1903
Lasius alienus (Foerster, 1850)
Lasius americanus Emery 1893
†Lasius anthracinus (Heer, 1867)
Lasius aphidicola (Walsh, 1863)
Lasius arizonicus Wheeler, 1917
Lasius atopus Cole, 1958
Lasius austriacus Schlick-Steiner, Steiner, Schödl & Seifert, 2003
Lasius balcanicus Seifert, 1988
Lasius balearicus Talavera, Espadaler & Vila, 2014
Lasius bicornis (Foerster, 1850)
Lasius bombycina Seifert & Galkowski, 2016
Lasius brevicornis Emery 1893
Lasius brevipalpus Seifert, 2020
Lasius brunneus (Latreille, 1798)
Lasius buccatus Stärcke, 1942
Lasius bureni (Wing, 1968)
Lasius californicus Wheeler, 1917
Lasius capitatus (Kuznetsov-Ugamsky, 1927)
Lasius carniolicus Mayr, 1861
Lasius casevitzi Seifert & Galkowski, 2016
†Lasius chambonensis Piton & Théobald, 1935
Lasius chinensis Seifert, 2020
Lasius cinereus Seifert, 1992
Lasius citrinus Emery, 1922
Lasius claviger (Roger, 1862)
Lasius colei (Wing, 1968)
Lasius coloradensis Wheeler, 1917
Lasius coloratus Santschi, 1937
Lasius creightoni (Wing, 1968)
Lasius creticus Seifert, 2020
Lasius crinitus (Smith, 1858)
†Lasius crispus Wilson, 1955
Lasius crypticus Wilson, 1955
Lasius distinguendus (Emery, 1916)
Lasius draco Collingwood, 1982
Lasius elevatus Bharti & Gul, 2013
Lasius emarginatus (Olivier, 1792)
†Lasius epicentrus Théobald, 1937
Lasius escamole Reza, 1925
Lasius excavatus Seifert, 2020
Lasius fallax Wilson, 1955
Lasius flavescens Forel, 1904
Lasius flavoniger Seifert, 1992
Lasius flavus (Fabricius, 1782)
Lasius fuji Radchenko, 2005
Lasius fuliginosus (Latreille, 1798)
†Lasius globularis (Heer, 1849)
†Lasius glom LaPolla & Greenwalt, 2015
Lasius grandis Forel, 1909
Lasius hayashi Yamauchi & Hayashida, 1970
Lasius hikosanus Yamauchi, 1979
Lasius himalayanus Bingham, 1903
Lasius hirsutus Seifert, 1992
Lasius humilis Wheeler, 1917
Lasius illyricus Zimmermann, 1935
†Lasius inflatus (Zhang, 1989)
Lasius interjectus Mayr, 1866
Lasius israelicus Seifert, 2020
Lasius japonicus Santschi, 1941
Lasius jensi Seifert, 1982
Lasius kabaki Seifert, 2020
Lasius karpinisi Seifert, 1992
Lasius koreanus Seifert, 1992
Lasius kritikos Seifert, 2020
Lasius lasioides (Emery, 1869)
Lasius latipes (Walsh, 1863)
Lasius lawarai Seifert, 1992
†Lasius longaevus (Heer, 1849)
Lasius longiceps Seifert, 1988
Lasius longicirrus Chang & He, 2002
Lasius longipalpus Seifert, 2020
†Lasius longipennis (Heer, 1849)
Lasius magnus Seifert, 1992
Lasius maltaeus Seifert, 2020
Lasius mauretanicus Seifert, 2020
Lasius meridionalis (Bondroit, 1920)
Lasius mexicanus Wheeler, 1914
Lasius mikir Collingwood, 1982
Lasius minutus Emery, 1893
Lasius mixtus (Nylander, 1846)
†Lasius mordicus Zhang, 1989
Lasius morisitai Yamauchi, 1979
Lasius murphyi Forel, 1901
Lasius myops Forel, 1894
Lasius myrmidon Mei, 1998
Lasius nearcticus Wheeler, 1906
Lasius neglectus Van Loon, Boomsma & Andrasfalvy, 1990
†Lasius nemorivagus Wheeler, 1915
Lasius neoniger Emery, 1893
Lasius nevadensis Cole, 1956
Lasius niger (Linnaeus, 1758)
Lasius nigrescens Stitz, 1930
Lasius nipponensis Forel, 1912
Lasius nitidigaster Seifert, 1996
†Lasius oblongus Assmann, 1870
Lasius obscuratus Stitz, 1930
Lasius occidentalis Wheeler, 1909
†Lasius occultatus (Heer, 1849)
†Lasius ophthalmicus (Heer, 1849)
Lasius orientalis Karavaiev, 1912
Lasius pallitarsis (Provancher, 1881)
Lasius paralienus Seifert, 1992
†Lasius peritulus (Cockerell, 1927)
Lasius persicus Seifert, 2020
Lasius piliferus Seifert, 1992
Lasius platythorax Seifert, 1991
Lasius plumopilosus Buren, 1941
Lasius pogonogynus Buren, 1950
Lasius precursor Seifert, 2020
Lasius productus Wilson, 1955
Lasius przewalskii Ruzsky, 1915
Lasius psammophilus Seifert, 1992
Lasius pubescens Buren, 1942
†Lasius pumilus Mayr, 1868
†Lasius punctulatus Mayr, 1868
Lasius rabaudi (Bondroit, 1917)
Lasius reginae Faber, 1967
Lasius sabularum (Bondroit, 1918)
Lasius sakagamii Yamauchi & Hayashida, 1970
Lasius schaeferi Seifert, 1992
†Lasius schiefferdeckeri Mayr, 1868
Lasius schulzi Seifert, 1992
Lasius sichuense Seifert, 2020
Lasius silvaticus Seifert, 2020
Lasius sitiens Wilson, 1955
Lasius sonobei Yamauchi, 1979
Lasius spathepus Wheeler, 1910
Lasius speculiventris Emery, 1893
Lasius subglaber Emery, 1893
Lasius subumbratus Viereck, 1903
Lasius talpa Wilson, 1955
Lasius tapinomoides Salata & Borowiec, 2018
Lasius tebessae Seifert, 1992
†Lasius tertiarius Zalessky, 1949
Lasius tibialis Santschi, 1936
†Lasius truncatus Zhang, 1989
Lasius tunisius Seifert, 2020
Lasius turcicus Santschi, 1921
Lasius umbratus (Nylander, 1846)
Lasius uzbeki Seifert, 1992
†Lasius validus Zhang, 1989
Lasius vestitus Wheeler, 1910
†Lasius vetulus Dlussky, 1981
Lasius viehmeyeri Emery, 1922
Lasius vostochni Seifert, 2020
Lasius wittmeri Seifert, 1992
Lasius xerophilus MacKay & MacKay, 1994

References

External links

 
Ant genera
Extant Eocene first appearances